The ICON Complex is a low rise building in Hobart, Tasmania, situated in the city's centre. ICON Complex has access on two main street fronts, Murray and Liverpool. The Myer department store is situated on Liverpool Street, replacing the Myer lost on the same site in 2007. The Liverpool Street site consists of the ICON Complex shopping centre, boasting many national and international brands including MECCA MAXIMA and Scotch and Soda (Clothing).

ICON Complex will mark InterContinental Hotels Group's entry into the Tasmanian market with the 235-room Crowne Plaza Hobart.

Stage 1 opened in November 2015 and Stage 2 opened in May 2018.

History

Being relatively small compared to interstate capital cities, the city of Hobart long drew a sense of its identity from the Myer department store. Occupying , with frontages on both Liverpool and Murray streets, it was known as Hobart's Anchor store. In 2007, a fire destroyed the larger, Liverpool street section of Myer.

See also
 List of tallest buildings in Hobart

References

2018 establishments in Australia
Shopping malls established in 2018
Shopping centres in Tasmania
Hotels in Hobart
Proposed buildings and structures in Australia
Liverpool Street, Hobart